York City Football Club is a professional association football club based in York, North Yorkshire, England. Formed in May 1922, the club failed to be elected to the Football League for the 1922–23 season, but succeeded in gaining admission to the Midland League. After seven seasons of competing in the Midland League, the club was elected to play in the Football League ahead of 1929–30. After 75 years of Football League membership, York were relegated to the Football Conference in 2004. This is where the club remained for eight years before promotion back to the Football League was achieved with victory in the 2012 Conference Premier play-off Final. However, York were relegated to the National League four years later.

The club's first team have competed in numerous competitions, and all players who have played in 100 or more first-team matches, either as a member of the starting eleven or as a substitute, are listed below. Each player's details include the duration of his York career, his typical playing position while with the club, and the number of matches played and goals scored in domestic league matches and in all senior competitive matches. Where applicable, the list also includes the national team for which the player was selected, and the number of senior international caps he won.

Introduction
Barry Jackson holds the record for York total and league appearances, having played 539 matches in all competitions and 482 matches in the Football League between 1958 and 1970. He is followed by Andy McMillan, who made 492 total appearances and 421 league appearances from 1987 to 1999. The appearance record for a goalkeeper is held by Tommy Forgan, having played 428 matches between 1954 and 1966. The player who has won the most international caps while at the club is Peter Scott with seven for Northern Ireland from 1976 to 1978.

The goalscoring record is held by Norman Wilkinson, with 127 league goals, and 143 in total, scored between 1954 and 1966. Keith Walwyn came three goals from equalling Wilkinson's total goals record, with 140 goals, including 119 in the league, scored between 1981 and 1987. Jimmy Cowie holds the records for the most league and total goals scored in a season, set in 1928–29, with 49 league goals in as many matches in the Midland League and 56 goals in all competitions. For the Football League-era, the record for most goals in a season is held by Arthur Bottom, who scored 39 in 1954–55.

Key
The list is ordered first by number of appearances in total, then by number of league appearances, and then if necessary by date of debut.
Appearances as a substitute are included.
Statistics are correct up to and including the match played on 18 March 2023. Where a player left the club permanently after this date, his statistics are updated to his date of leaving.

Players with 100 or more appearances

Players with fewer than 100 appearances

Notes

Player statistics include matches played while on loan from:

References
General

Specific

Players
 
York City
York City F.C. Players
Association football player non-biographical articles